Martin Ondrejka (born 8 January 1983) is a Slovak footballer who currently plays for the Slovak Corgoň Liga club FC ViOn.

References

1983 births
Living people
Slovak footballers
Association football midfielders
ŠK Slovan Bratislava players
FC ViOn Zlaté Moravce players
Slovak Super Liga players
People from Zlaté Moravce
Sportspeople from the Nitra Region